Euclystis manto is a species of moth in the family Erebidae. The species is found in Central America (including Costa Rica) and South America (including Guyana).

References

Moths described in 1776
Omopterini
Taxa named by Pieter Cramer